Ioan Miszti (born 30 April 1969) is a Romanian former football defender.

Notes

References

1969 births
Living people
Romanian footballers
Liga I players
Liga II players
CFR Cluj players
ACF Gloria Bistrița players
Association football defenders